Jana Pérez (born 23 September 1986) is a Spanish actress and model.

Biography 
Raised in the neighborhood of Horta, Barcelona, she made her debut as an advertising model at the age of 6. At that same age he met his father (who is from Ceuta).

Her grandfather was a boxing champion in Spain.

In 2013 she starred in the global campaign The House of Häagen-Dazs, alongside actor Bradley Cooper.

Filmography 

 2013: Love Matters (as Matilda)
 2015: Cinderella (as Princess Chelina of Zaragoza)
 2016: Our Kind of Traitor (as Maria)
 2018: Fariña (as Camila Reyes)
 2018: Holmes & Watson (as Lestrade's wife)
 2021: The One (as Sophia Rodriguez)

References

External links
 

1986 births
Living people
20th-century Spanish actresses
21st-century Spanish actresses
Actresses from Barcelona
Spanish emigrants to the United Kingdom
Spanish expatriates in the United Kingdom
Spanish female models
Spanish film actresses
Spanish stage actresses
Spanish television actresses
Spanish television personalities